FLAT 211 is a 2017 Indian mystery Suspense film produced and directed by Sunil Sanjan. The film features new cast from TV and theatre world. It tells about an incident inside a flat numbered 211. The film was released on 2 June 2017.

Plot
An incident occurs at Flat 211 and the characters connected to this flat get involved in the incident leading to a mess. The mysterious identity of the person responsible for the incident grows leading to a dramatic turn of events. The film revolves around a murder mystery.

Cast
 Sonal Singh
 Jayesh Raj
 Digvijay Singh
 Samonica Shrivastava
 Danish Kohli

Soundtrack

Despite new cast, the film was musically big as some of the biggest names from Hindi film industry were part of it i.e. Mika Singh, Harshdeep Kaur, Ash King, Mohammed Irfan (singer), Divya Kumar (singer) and Tarannum Mallik. There are total 5 songs in the film plus 2 unplugged versions. Initial music launch was done on 19 April 2017.

Awards

 Flat 211 is nominated in 'Best Drama Feature' category at Genre Celebration Festival.
 Flat 211 is nominated in 'Best Actress' category at Genre Celebration Festival.
 Flat 211 was nominated as 'Best Film' at Los Angeles Cinefest.
 Flat 211 is FINALIST winner at Red Corner Film Festival.

References

External links

 
 

2017 films
Films set in Mumbai
2017 crime drama films
2017 crime thriller films
2010s mystery thriller films
Indian crime drama films
Indian crime thriller films
Films shot in Dubai
Indian mystery thriller films
2010s Hindi-language films
Films about organised crime in India